The Innsiders is the Barbershop quartet that won the 1976 SPEBSQSA international competition.

External links
 AIC entry (archived)

Barbershop quartets
Barbershop Harmony Society